"I'm Not for Everyone" is a song by American country music duo Brothers Osborne. It was released on April 26, 2021 as the second single from the duo's third studio album Skeletons. The song was written by John Osborne, TJ Osborne, Luke Dick and Natalie Hemby, and produced by Jay Joyce.

Background
After closing out the 56th ACM Awards, the duo released "I'm Not for Everyone". A Universal Music Group Nashville press release stated that the song "could also be an inspirational quote for those who feel they aren't like everyone else". The duo said: "That IS our mission statement, 'cause we ARE not for everyone. I think at some point, not only in your career, but your life as a human being, you can't make everyone happy. We have spoken up so many times, and we have, I wouldn't say we've paid much of a price, but we’ve pissed a lot of people off by being ourselves. We just have to accept that no matter we are not for everybody and you have to be okay with that. And this is the first song where I actually, I sing a verse on, which is perfect because this song in particular is the both of us saying we're not everybody's cup of tea and that's okay."

Critical reception
Philip Trapp of Taste of Country opined that the song "might be for anyone who's ever felt like an outsider to country music".

Music video
The music video was released on August 12, 2021, and directed by Wes Edwards and Ryan "Flash" Silver. The video stars actor and singer Leslie Jordan. It showcases Jordan "walking into a bar ridden with fights, disagreements and animosity while John and TJ Osborne perform their song on stage". Jeremy Chua of Sounds Like Nashville described the clip as "part rowdy, part hilarious, and wholly wholesome".

Live performance
On April 18, 2021, the duo performed the song at the 56th ACM Awards.

Charts

Certifications

Release history

References

2021 singles
2021 songs
Brothers Osborne songs
Songs written by Luke Dick
Songs written by Natalie Hemby
Song recordings produced by Jay Joyce
Universal Music Group singles